Ruslan Gurbanov (born 12 September 1991) is an Azerbaijani football striker.

Career

Club
Gurbanov was born in 1991 in Stavropol, Russia at a Lezgi family. He played for Dynamo Stavropol and Rostov during his junior career. In 2008, he started playing for the reserve team of FC Rostov. During the next two seasons, he also played on loan for Russian Professional Football League (third division) teams Krasny Sulin and Taganrog. After being released by Rostov, Qurbanov moved to Azerbaijan where he signed a contract with the most titled local club Neftchi Baku. He played 6 matches in his first professional season and became the champion of Azerbaijan Premier League. Between 2011 and 2013, Qurbanov spent two seasons playing on loan for Sumgayit where he played 53 games and scored 9 goals. After his return to Neftchi, he became the winner of Azerbaijani Cup in 2013–14 season. He had a brief spell at Croatian football club Hajduk Split where he played 5 matches for the senior team, and a match for the reserve team. Ruslan Qurbanov returned to Neftchi once again in 2015, and became the regular player of the starting squad during the 2015–16 season. He made a total of 30 appearances in the Premier League during the season, in which he scored 13 goals and became the most goal scoring Azeri player of the league.

On 31 August 2016, Qurbanov signed a two-year contract with Gabala FK, leaving Gabala on 31 May 2018.

On 11 June 2018, Qurbanov signed with Sabail FK.

On 16 June 2020, Keşla announced that they had Qurbanov's contract with the club had not been extended and he had left the club.

On 19 July 2020, Gurbanov signed a two-year contract with Zira FK.

International
He called up for Azerbaijan at 2015.

Career statistics

Club

International

Statistics accurate as of match played 20 November 2018

International goals

Honours
Neftchi Baku
Azerbaijan Premier League (1): 2010–11
Azerbaijan Cup (1): 2013–14

References

External links
 

1991 births
People from Stavropol
Living people
Azerbaijani footballers
Association football forwards
Azerbaijan international footballers
Azerbaijan Premier League players
Croatian Football League players
Expatriate footballers in Croatia
Expatriate footballers in Belarus
Azerbaijani expatriate footballers
FC Rostov players
FC Nika Krasny Sulin players
FC Taganrog players
Neftçi PFK players
Sumgayit FK players
HNK Hajduk Split players
Gabala FC players
Sabail FK players
Shamakhi FK players
Zira FK players
FC Slavia Mozyr players